This is a complete list of managers of A.S. Roma.

List

References

A.S. Roma managers
Roma